Pseudochondrula is a genus of gastropods belonging to the family Enidae.

The species of this genus are found in Western Asia.

Species:

Pseudochondrula armeniaca 
Pseudochondrula arsaci 
Pseudochondrula bondouxi 
Pseudochondrula darii 
Pseudochondrula lederi 
Pseudochondrula orientalis 
Pseudochondrula purus 
Pseudochondrula sinistrorsa 
Pseudochondrula tuberifera

References

Gastropods